Marek Švec may refer to:
 Marek Švec (wrestler)
 Marek Švec (footballer)